Big Brother, the American version of the worldwide television show, features contestants (called houseguests) that compete against each other to be the last Big Brother house resident and win $500,000. The series first aired in 2000, and 24 seasons have been completed as of 2022. Big Brother contestants are chosen by the show's producers through an application process that includes a videotape submission, semi-final interviews at select cities, and a final interview in Los Angeles. Contestants are also recruited through various means but then follow the same subsequent interview process to appear on the show.

As of season 24, a total of 316 participants have competed in Big Brother and in Big Brother: Over The Top, and 40 of them have competed in multiple seasons. A total of 34 participants have competed in Celebrity Big Brother, which increases the total number of Big Brother participants to 350. Big Brother 7 was an All-Star edition, which featured 14 returning HouseGuests chosen either through viewer vote or by producers from an initial group of 20 candidates.  For Big Brother 11, four past HouseGuests were given the chance to return based on the results of the season's first competition, after which one of them entered the house. Season 13 featured three "Dynamic Duos" from previous seasons, season 14 brought in four Big Brother veterans to coach the 12 new HouseGuests and season 18 saw the return of four returnees playing the game with 12 new houseguests. In Big Brother: Over the Top, former HouseGuests Jason Roy and Jozea Flores were given the chance to return through a public vote. Roy won the public vote and became the 13th houseguest. The 19th season brought along the return of a past houseguest as the 17th houseguest, but that houseguest was actually there to take the spot of one of the 16 new houseguests, as a consequence for one of the newbies taking a temptation. Season 22 was another All-Star edition, featuring 16 returning HouseGuests, all chosen by production.

While most players are evicted from the house by vote, some have chosen to leave the house on their own volition, referred to as "Walking", while others were ejected, or "Expelled", by the producers for flagrant violation of the rules, such as engaging in violent behavior or intentionally damaging game equipment. Other HouseGuests have returned to the game after eviction, usually due to a twist but once as a replacement for a HouseGuest who walked.

Contestants

Main edition

Digital edition

 Contestant's age at the start of the season.
 U.S. state abbreviations can be found here.

Contestants competing in International versions

Deaths

2017
 December 24 - Kent Blackwelder, Big Brother 2 houseguest. (b. 1955)

2019
 September 25 - Cassandra Waldon, Big Brother 1 houseguest. (b. 1962)

References

General

Specific

 
Big Brother (American TV series)